Hurricane Alma was the first of three consecutively named storms to make landfall on the Pacific coast of Mexico during a ten-day span in June, 1996. Alma was the third tropical cyclone, first named storm, and first hurricane for the 1996 Pacific hurricane season. It is believed by meteorologists that the storm originated out of an Atlantic tropical wave which crossed Central America in the middle of June. In warmer than average waters of the open Pacific, it gradually organized and it was first designated as a tropical depression on June 20 before quickly intensifying to a tropical storm. Early on June 22 the storm was upgraded to a hurricane and subsequently reached peak intensity of 969 mb, a Category 2 on the Saffir-Simpson Hurricane Scale. Alma made landfall on Mexico's shoreline, but it soon moved back out over water and began to weaken. Alma had severe impact in Mexico. Twenty deaths were reported. Damage is unknown.

Meteorological history

The origins of Alma is believed to be related to the tropical wave which spawned Tropical Storm Arthur in the Atlantic. Satellite imagery and upper–air observations indicated that the disturbance crossed Central America during the middle of June, entering warming than average waters of the Pacific. Initially, the system was located within a sheared environment, although it did not hinder development. The convection soon became aligned with the low–level center and during the overnight on June 20 it was designated as a tropical depression. The depression intensified and it was upgraded to Tropical Storm Alma later that day. The wind shear relaxed it was upgraded to a hurricane at early on July 22 while tracking generally northwest.

A mid–level trough located near Baja California and a mid- to-upper-level low over the southwest Gulf of Mexico began to steer Alma northward towards the southwest coast of Mexico, prior to reaching a peak intensity of 969 mb at 1200 UTC on June 23. Before long, the steering flow collapsed and the hurricane drifted further towards land. Later that day it made landfall near Lazaro Cardenas, although Alma quickly moved back over open water and meandered for about 36 hours. This made the hurricane the first of three consecutive storms to make landfall on, the Pacific coast of Mexico during a ten-day span. It weakened to a tropical storm over land, before moving back to the open waters.

However, a small portion of the circulation of Alma was still over land, and thus it was severely disrupted by Mexico's high terrain. Alma was tracking slowly along a path roughly parallel to the coastline, it was further downgraded to a tropical depression on June 25. Alma remained weak and dissipated on June 27.

Alma was forecasted well, with errors well below long-term averages at the time. Despite this, tropical cyclone prediction models were a mixture of accurate and inaccurate, with the Aviation and GFDL models performing badly and the OFCI model performing well. The errors in dynamic models was attributed to a lack of data on upper-air conditions over the ocean southwest of the cyclone.

Preparations and Impact
In anticipation for the storm, hurricane warnings were placed into effect along  of coastline between the resorts of Zihuatenejo and Manzanillo. Hundreds of people were evacuated prior to the passage of the hurricane. Also, the Mexican government sent troops to the area to help with disaster relief, and the Michoacán state government sent five truckloads of bedding and medicines. Prior to landfall, 14 inches of rain was expected.

Also, there were reports of swells up to  along the coast. Three people died in Lazaro Cardenas when their house collapsed. Alma ripped roofs off of some houses, downed power lines and uprooted numerous trees, Flooding for Alma left thousands homeless. Heavy rainfall resulted in major flooding in Puebla, which killed 17 people. In all, 20 deaths were reported in Mexico. Damage is unknown, since the official report has no damage figures.

See also

Other tropical cyclones named Alma
List of Pacific hurricanes

References

External links
National Hurricane Center's Tropical Cyclone Report

Alma 1996
Alma 1996
Alma 1996